Rafael Sperafico (22 April 1981 – 9 December 2007) was a Brazilian racing driver.  He was the cousin of fellow racing drivers Ricardo and Rodrigo, and also related to Alexandre. He was born in Toledo, Paraná.

Career

Barber Dodge
Sperafico competed in the United States-based Barber Dodge Pro Series from 2000 to 2002, finishing as championship runner-up in his final year.

Euro F3000
Sperafico moved to Europe for 2003 to compete in the Euro Formula 3000 series, where he finished 15th in the championship with two points.  He thus followed in the footsteps of his relatives Ricardo, Rodrigo and Alexandre, who had all previously competed in the FIA International version of the series.

Renault Clio Cup
In 2006, Sperafico took part in the Renault Super Clio Cup Brazil, finishing fourth in the championship.

Death
On 9 December 2007, Sperafico was driving in a Stock Car Light race at the Autódromo José Carlos Pace, supporting the season finale of the main Stock Car Brasil championship in which his older cousins Ricardo and Rodrigo were both competing.  On lap six of the race, Sperafico lost control of his car on the fast left-hand corner immediately before the start-finish straight (Subida dos Boxes) and speared into the retaining wall on the right-hand side of the circuit at high speed.  The force of the impact saw the damaged car rebound onto the racing line, where it was t-boned by Renato Russo, triggering a pile-up involving several other drivers.  The race was stopped and the circuit's medical personnel arrived on the scene quickly. Sperafico died at the scene from massive head injuries.  Russo also suffered severe head injuries and was taken to hospital, where he was in a serious but stable condition.  Several other drivers were treated for minor injuries.  Russo (https://pt.wikipedia.org/wiki/Renato_Russo_)(piloto) was released from hospital on 17 December.

On the same day, Sperafico's cousin, Rodrigo, became runner-up of the 2007 Stock Car Brasil Championship. Gustavo Sondermann, Rafael Sperafico's team-mate at the time, was killed a few years later in an almost identical crash at the same corner.

Complete motorsports results

American Open-Wheel racing results
(key) (Races in bold indicate pole position, races in italics indicate fastest race lap)

Barber Dodge Pro Series

Complete Euro Formula 3000 results
(key) (Races in bold indicate pole position) (Races in italics indicate fastest lap)

References

External links

1981 births
2007 deaths
Racing drivers who died while racing
Brazilian racing drivers
Auto GP drivers
Sport deaths in Brazil
People from Toledo, Paraná
Barber Pro Series drivers
Rafael
Filmed deaths in motorsport
Sportspeople from Paraná (state)